There are more than 870 species of flower fly (Syrphidae) in North America
. The following is an attempt at a comprehensive North American list of this family of insects.

Family Syrphidae

Subfamily Syrphinae

Tribe Bacchini

Genus Baccha Fabricius, 1805 
 Baccha elongata (Fabricius, 1775)

Genus Melanostoma Schiner, 1860 
 Melanostoma mellinum (Linnaeus, 1758)

Genus Platycheirus Lepeletier & Serville, 1828 
70 species

Tribe Paragini

Genus Paragus Latreille

Tribe Pipizini

Genus Pipiza Fallén 
Pipiza crassipes (Bigot, 1884)  
Pipiza cribbeni (Coovert, 1996)
Pipiza davidsoni (Curran, 1921) 
Pipiza distincta (Curran, 1921) 
Pipiza femoralis (Loew, 1866)
Pipiza macrofemoralis (Curran, 1921)
Pipiza nigripilosa  (Williston, 1887) 
Pipiza puella ( Williston, 1887)  
Pipiza quadrimaculata  (Panzer, 1802)

Genus Heringia Rondani, 1856 
Heringia calcarata Loew, 1866
Heringia latitarsis (Egger, 1865)

Genus Trichopsomyia Williston, 1888 
Trichopsomyia apisaon Walker, 1849
Trichopsomyia australis (Johnson, 1907)
Trichopsomyia litoralis Vockeroth, 1988
Trichopsomyia nigritarsis (Curran, 1924)
Trichopsomyia occidentalis (Townsend, 1897)
Trichopsomyia pubescens (Loew, 1863)
Trichopsomyia recedens (Walker, 1852)
Trichopsomyia rufithoracica (Curran, 1921)
Trichopsomyia similis (Curran, 1924)

Tribe Syrphini

Genus Allograpta Osten Sacken 
5 species 
 Allograpta exotica
 Allograpta obliqua
 Allograpta micrura
 Allograpta radiata

Genus Chrysotoxum Meigen 
13 species

Genus Dasysyrphus Enderlein 
14 species

Genus Didea Macquart 
2 species 
 Didea alneti
 Didea fuscipes

Genus Dioprosopa Hull, 1949
 Dioprosopa clavata

Genus Doros Meigen 
 Doros aequalis

Genus Epistrophe Walker 
 Epistrophe grossulariae
 Epistrophe metcalfi
 Epistrophe nitidicollis
 Epistrophe terminalis
 Epistrophe xanthostoma

Genus Epistrophella 
 Epistrophella emarginata

Genus Eriozona Schiner 
 Eriozona laxa

Genus Eupeodes Osten Sacken 
21 Species

Genus Lapposyrphus  
 Lapposyrphus aberrantis
 Lapposyrphus lapponicus

Genus Leucozona Schiner 
 Leucozona americana
Leucozona lucorum (Linnaeus, 1758)
 Leucozona velutina
 Leucozona xylotoides

Genus Melangyna Verrall 
 Melangyna arctica
 Melangyna fisherii
 Melangyna labiatarum
 Melangyna lasiophthalma
 Melangyna subfasciata
Melangyna triangulifera (Zetterstedt, 1843)
 Melangyna umbellatarum

Genus Meligramma Frey 
 Meligramma guttata
 Meligramma triangulifera
 Meligramma vespertina

Genus Meliscaeva Frey 
 Meliscaeva cinctella

Genus Ocyptamus Macquart 
14 species

Genus Orphnabaccha Vockeroth, 1969 
Orphnabaccha coerulea (Williston, 1891)
Orphnabaccha jactator (Loew, 1861)

Genus Parasyrphus Matsumura 
 Parasyrphus currani (Fluke, 1935) 
 Parasyrphus genualis (Williston, 1887) 
 Parasyrphus groenlandicus (Nielsen, 1910)
 Parasyrphus insolitus (Osburn, 1908)
 Parasyrphus macularis (Zetterstedt, 1843)
Parasyrphus melanderi (Curran , 1925) 
 Parasyrphus nigritarsis (Zetterstedt, 1843)
 Parasyrphus relictus (Zetterstedt)
 Parasyrphus semiinterruptus (Fluke, 1935)
 Parasyrphus tarsatus (Zetterstedt, 1838)
Parasyrphus vockerothi (Thompson , 2012)

Genus Philhelius  
 Philhelius flavipes

Genus Salpingogaster Schiner 
 Salpingogaster punctifrons
 Salpingogaster nepenthe

Genus Scaeva  
 Scaeva pyrastri
 Scaeva selenitica

Genus Sphaerophoria  
13 species

Genus Syrphus  
11 species

Tribe Toxomerini

Genus Toxomerus 
23 species

Subfamily Microdontinae

Genus Aristosyrphus 
Aristosyrphus carpenteri (Hull, 1945)
Aristosyrphus samperi Thompson, 2008 – Colombia, Peru & Costa Rica

Genus Carreramyia 
Carreramyia megacephalus (Shannon, 1925)

Genus Microdon 
29 species

Genus Mixogaster 
Key to North American species

Mixogaster delongi (Hull, 1926) 
Mixogaster johnsoni  (Hull, 1941) 
Mixogaster breviventris (Kahl, 1897)  
Mixogaster fattigi (Skevington & Locke, 2019)

Genus Omegasyrphus 
Omegasyrphus pallipennis (Curran, 1925)

Genus Peradon 
Peradon chrysopygus (Giglio-Tos, 1892)

Genus Pseudomicrodon 
Pseudomicrodon claripennis (Hine, 1914)

Genus Rhopalosyrphus 
Rhopalosyrphus guentherii (Lynch Arribálzaga, 1891)
Rhopalosyrphus ramulorum Weems & Deyrup, 2003,

Genus Ubristes 
Ubristes jaguarinus Reemer, 2013

Subfamily Eristalinae

Tribe Brachyopini

Genus Brachyopa Meigen, 1822
17 species

Genus Chrysogaster Meigen, 1803
Chrysogaster antitheus Walker, 1849
Chrysogaster inflatifrons Shannon, 1916

Genus Chrysosyrphus Sedman, 1965
Chrysosyrphus alaskensis (Shannon, 1922)
Chrysosyrphus frontosus (Bigot, 1884)
Chrysosyrphus latus (Loew, 1863)
Chrysosyrphus nasuta (Zetterstedt, 1838)
Chrysosyrphus nigripennis (Williston, 1882)

Genus Hammerschmidtia  Schummel, 1834 

 Hammerschmidtia sedmani (Vockeroth, Moran & Skevington, 2019)
 Hammerschmidtia ferruginea  ([Fallen, 1817)

Genus Myolepta 
8 species
 Myolepta auricaudata (Williston, 1891)
 Myolepta aurinota (Hine, 1903)
 Myolepta camillae Weems, 1956
 Myolepta cornellia ([Shannon , 1923)
 Myolepta lunulata Bigot, 1884
 Myolepta nigra (Loew, 1972)
 Myolepta strigilata (Loew, 1872)
 Myolepta varipes (Loew, 1869)

Genus Neoascia 
Neoascia distincta Williston, 1887
Neoascia geniculata (Meigen, 1822)
Neoascia globosa (Walker, 1849)
Neoascia metallica (Williston, 1882)
Neoascia meticulosa (Scopoli, 1763)
Neoascia sphaerophoria Curran, 1925
Neoascia subchalybea Curran, 1925
 Neoascia tenur (Harris, 1780)  The Black-kneed Fen Fly is a common species that was formerly considered to be only European now considered to be throughout North America and Canada.
N. unifasciata (Strobl, 1898)
Neoascia willistoni Thompson, 1986

Genus Orthonevra

Genus Sphegina

Tribe Callicerini

Genus Callicera 
Callicera duncani Curran, 1935
Callicera erratica (Walker, 1849)
Callicera montensis Snow, 1892

Tribe Cerioidini

Genus  Ceriana

Genus   Monoceromyia 
Monoceromyia floridensis  (Shannon, 1922)

Genus Polybiomyia

Genus  Sphiximorpha 
Sphiximorpha cylindrica  (Curran, 1921)
Sphiximorpha loewii  (Williston, 1887)

Tribe Eristalini

Genus Eristalinus 
 Eristalinus aeneus Scopoli, 1844
 Eristalinus taeniops Weidemann, 1818

Genus Eristalis

Genus Helophilus 
12 species

Genus Lejops

Genus Mallota 
11 species 
Mallota albipes Snow, 1895
Mallota bautias (Walker, 1849)
Mallota bequaerti Hull, 1956
Mallota posticata (Fabricius, 1805)
Mallota sackeni Williston, 1882

Genus Meromacrus 
Meromacrus acutus (fabricus, 1805)
Meromacrus croceatus Hull, 1960
Meromacrus draco Hull, 1942e
Meromacrus gloriosus Hull, 1941
Meromacrus minuticornis Thompson, 2001 
Meromacrus panamensis Curran, 1930

Genus Myathropa 
 Myathropa florea

Genus Palpada Macquart, 1854

Genus Parhelophilus

Tribe Sericomyini

Genus Sericomyia 
14 species

Genus Pyritis 
 Pyritis kincaidii

Tribe Merodontini

Genus Eumerus 
 Eumerus funeralis

Genus Merodon 
 Merodon equestris  - Narcissus bulb fly

Genus Nausigaster 
 Nausigaster texana
 Nausigaster unimaculata

Tribe Milesini

Genus Blera Billberg, 1820

Genus Brachypalpus 
 Brachypalpus alopex (Osten Sacken, 1877)
 Brachypalpus cyanella Osten Sacken, 1877
 Brachypalpus oarus (Walker, 1849)

Genus Chalcosyrphus

Genus Criorhina 
14 species

Genus Cynorhinella 
 Cynorhinella longinasus
 Cynorhinella bella

Genus Hadromyia Williston, 1882

Subgenus Chrysosomidia Curran, 1934
Hadromyia aepalius (Walker, 1849)
Hadromyia aldrichi (Shannon, 1916)
Hadromyia crawfordi (Shannon, 1916)
Hadromyia opaca (Shannon, 1916)
Hadromyia pulchra (Williston, 1882)

Subgenus Hadromyia Williston, 1882
Hadromyia grandis Williston, 1882

Genus Merapoides 
 Merapoides villosus

Genus Milesia 
3 species 
 Milesia bella (Townsend, 1897)
 Milesia scutellata (Hull, 1924)
 Milesia virginiensis  (Drury, 1773)

Genus Palumbia 
 Palumbia inflata (Macquart, 1834)

Genus Pocota 
Pocota bomboides Hunter, 1897

Genus Pterallastes Loew, 1863
Pterallastes thoracicus Loew, 1863

Genus Somula  Macquart, 1847
Somula decora Macquart, 1847
Somula mississippiensis Hull, 1922

Genus Sphecomyia 
14 species

Genus Spilomyia 
10 species

Genus Syritta 
 Syritta pipiens
 Syritta flaviventris

Genus Temnostoma 
10 species

Genus Teuchocnemis 
 Teuchocnemis bacuntius

Genus Tropidia 
8 species

Genus Xylota 
29 species

Tribe Rhingiini

Genus Chamaesyrphus

Genus Cheilosia

Genus Ferdinandea 

 Ferdinandea aeneicolor Shannon, 1924
 Ferdinandea buccata (Loew, 1863)
 Ferdinandea croesus (Osten Sacken, 1877)

Genus Rhingia 
 Rhingia nasica

Genus Hiatomyia

Tribe Volucellini

Genus Copestylum 
82 species

Genus Ornidia 
 Ornidia obesa

Genus Volucella 
 Volucella bombylans

References

External links
 Family Syrphidae - Hover Flies

Diptera of North America
Flower flies, North America
List, North America
Flower fly